Eppes Island, also known as Shirley Hundred Island, is an island and a historic home and archaeological site near Hopewell, Charles City County, Virginia. The island was originally settled as part of Shirley Hundred. The island contains five 17th century sites, two 18th century sites and one dwelling dated to about 1790.

It was added to the National Register of Historic Places in 1969.

References 

Archaeological sites on the National Register of Historic Places in Virginia
Landforms of Charles City County, Virginia
National Register of Historic Places in Charles City County, Virginia
Islands of Virginia